The 2019 World Cup of Pool was a professional pool doubles tournament, and the 13th edition of the World Cup of Pool. The event was contested by 32 pairs representing different nations, and took place at the Morningside Arena in Leicester, England, from 25 to 30 June 2019. As host nation, Great Britain were allowed to enter two teams in the draw.

The Austrian team of Mario He and Albin Ouschan won the event, defeating Carlo Biado and Jeff de Luna of the Philippines, 11–3 in the final. This was the Austrian pairs second title in three years, having also won the event in 2017. The pair had also reached the final in the 2018 event, losing just one game in three years.

Prize fund
The total prize money for the event:
Winners (per pair): $60,000
Runners-up (per pair): $30,000
Semi-finalists (per pair): $15,000
Quarter-finalists (per pair): $9,000	
Last 16 losers (per pair): $4,500
Last 32 losers (per pair): $3,625

Teams
Each competing nation features two players, with the hosts, Great Britain, receiving two places. The competing teams were made of the players below:

 A
 B

Tournament bracket
Source:

References

External links

2019
2019 in cue sports
2019 in English sport
2019 World Cup of Pool
June 2019 sports events in the United Kingdom